Meshcherovo (Mişär) is a rural locality (a village) in Akbarisovsky Selsoviet, Sharansky District, Bashkortostan, Russia. The population was 179 as of 2010. There are 2 streets.

Geography 
Meshcherovo is located 9 km north of Sharan (the district's administrative centre) by road.

References 

Rural localities in Sharansky District